Jasper van der Westhuizen Wiese (born 21 October 1995) is a South African rugby union player who plays for Leicester Tigers in England's Premiership Rugby. He can play as an eighth man or a flanker. He was a Premiership Rugby champion in 2022, scoring a try in the final and being named as the Man of the Match.

Rugby career

2011–2013: Schoolboy rugby

Wiese was born and grew up in Upington. He attended and played rugby for Hoërskool Upington, which resulted in provincial call-ups for Griquas Country Districts in 2011, 2012 and 2013.

In 2011, Wiese was included in their Under-16 Grant Khomo Week squad for the tournament held in Queenstown. He started all three of their matches, scoring two tries in their second match against Border Country Districts in a 36–15 win and one in their final match against Namibia. His three tries during the tournament placed him in joint-third in the try-scoring charts for the competition, just one behind the leading try scorers.

The following year, Wiese was included in the Griquas Country Districts squad that competed in South Africa's premier rugby union tournament at high school level, the Under-18 Craven Week, held in Port Elizabeth. He emulated his appearance and try-scoring record at the previous year's Grant Khomo Week, scoring three tries in three starts. This time, he scored a hat-trick of tries in a 38–5 victory over Border Country Districts in their second match at the tournament, again a single try behind the leading try-scorers in the competition.

Wiese once again represented his team at the Under-18 Craven Week in 2013, held in Polokwane, starting all three matches and scoring two tries; he scored for the third successive year against Border Country Districts in their opening match and a second against the Leopards in their final match.

2014–2016: Free State and CUT Ixias

He made four appearances for CUT in group stages of the 2014 Varsity Shield competition – one of which was in the run-on side – in a season that saw his team win the competition by beating  in the final and subsequently winning promotion to the Varsity Cup for 2015. In the second half of the season, Wiese played for the  team in the Under-19 Provincial Championship. He started all of their matches in the number eight jersey, helping them to second spot on the log by scoring nine tries in the competition, second only to ' Jurie Linde in Group A of the competition. He didn't score in the first seven rounds of the competition, but got off the mark in a 34–0 victory over s in Round Eight. His final try came in their semi-final match against Western Province U19, but it wasn't enough to help his side into the final, with the team from Cape Town winning 29–22.

Wiese was invited to trials for the South Africa Under-20 squad as they prepared for the 2015 World Rugby Under 20 Championship, but wasn't included in the training squad named a week later. With Steven Meiring being the first choice eighth man for the team, Wiese shifted to the flank, where he made nine starts and three appearances of the bench. Wiese ended the competition as his team's third-highest try scorer behind fellow loose forwards Daniel Maartens and Steven Meiring, as the team finished in second place on the log.

After the Varsity Cup, Wiese joined the  team for their Currie Cup qualification season. He eventually made eight starts and one appearance off the bench during the competition as his team finished in sixth spot in the competition. He scored another try in their semi-final against Western Province, but his team's interest in the competition was ended with a 23–26 defeat.

2017: Cheetahs and Griffons

At the end of 2016, Wiese was included in the  Super Rugby team's training group for the 2017 Super Rugby season, but it was also announced that he would link up with the Welkom-based  after his Varsity Cup commitments.

2020: Leicester Tigers
On 23 July 2020 it was announced Wiese would move to England to join Leicester Tigers in Premiership Rugby from the 2020-21 season. Wiese made his Leicester debut against Gloucester only four days after meeting his team mates but impressed with his powerful carrying. On 20 February 2021 Wiese scored Leicester's first try in a win against Wasps but was sent off in the first half for hitting an opponents head with a dangerous ruck clear out, and was subsequently banned for four weeks.

On 5 June 2021 Wiese was called up to the Springboks squad for their test series against the British and Irish Lions.

Wiese was named as Man of the Match in the 2022 Premiership final, he scored the second try in Leicester's 15-12 win against Saracens.

Personal life

Wiese is the older brother of Cobus Wiese, also a South African rugby union player.

Notes

References

External links
 

South African rugby union players
Living people
1995 births
People from Upington
Rugby union flankers
Rugby union number eights
Free State Cheetahs players
Leicester Tigers players
Griffons (rugby union) players
Cheetahs (rugby union) players
South Africa international rugby union players
Rugby union players from the Northern Cape